Kinna IF is a Swedish football club located in Kinna in Mark Municipality, Västra Götaland County.

Background
Since their foundation in 1934 Kinna IF has participated mainly in the middle and lower divisions of the Swedish football league system.  The club currently plays in Division 3 Västra Götaland which is the fourth tier of Swedish football. They play their home matches at the Viskavallen in Kinna.

The club is affiliated to the Västergötlands Fotbollförbund.

Season to season

Attendances

In recent seasons Kinna IF have had the following average attendances:

External links
 Kinna IF – Official Website

Footnotes

Football clubs in Västra Götaland County
Association football clubs established in 1934
1934 establishments in Sweden